Awwad (in Arabic عوّاد, In English can be written as Awad)is an Arabic name or surname aka family name. People with the name include:

Given name
Awwad Al-Sharafat (born 25 December 1993) is a Jordanian middle-distance runner
Awwad Albalawi (born 1973), Saudi engineer

Surname
Ali Abu Awwad (born 1972), Palestinian activist and pacifist
Arabi Awwad (1928–2015), kunya Abu Fahd, Palestinian communist politician
Mohammed al-Awwad (died 2012), Syrian brigadier general 
Tawfiq Yusuf 'Awwad (1911–1989), Lebanese writer and diplomat
Tayseer Qala Awwad (born 1943), Syrian politician and minister
Saïd Moussa Awad سعيد عوّاد (born 1947 In El Mansouria, Lebanon ), Lebanese Interior Decorative Plaster and Decorative Plaster Sculptor, his wife Lina Awad لينا عوّاد is an Esthetician and a Salon owner; his sons Elias Awad الياس عوّاد and Chady Awad شادي عوّادare both MD physicians in Florida, USA. His Daughter Bettina Awad بيتينا عوّاد is a realtor and her and her sister Natasha Awad ناتاشا عوّاد are Business Bankers for Chase Bank in Florida, USA.

See also
Awad (and Aouad)